LA to Vegas is an American sitcom that was broadcast on Fox. The series debuted on January 2, 2018, as a midseason entry in the 2017–18 television season. Starring Dylan McDermott, Kim Matula, Ed Weeks, Nathan Lee Graham, Olivia Macklin, and Peter Stormare, the series follows the crew and regular passengers of the Los Angeles to Las Vegas route of budget airline Jackpot Airlines. On January 9, 2018, Fox picked up three additional episodes for a total of 15. On May 21, 2018, Fox canceled the series after one season.

Premise
The series follows the lives of the crew and passengers of a discount airline that makes regular Friday-to-Sunday getaway flights from Los Angeles to Las Vegas. The stories revolve around recurring themes of hope and disappointment.

Cast and characters

Main
Kim Matula as Veronica "Ronnie" Messing, a veteran flight attendant for Jackpot Airlines, a budget service operating out of Las Vegas.
Ed Weeks as Colin McCormack, a British professor of economics at UCLA. He and Ronnie strike up a romance after he separates from his wife. He travels to Las Vegas every weekend to visit his son.
Nathan Lee Graham as Bernard Jasser, a flamboyant male flight attendant who works alongside Ronnie.
Olivia Macklin as Nichole Hayes, a professional stripper who uses Jackpot Airlines to fly between Los Angeles and Las Vegas for work.
Peter Stormare as Artem, an eccentric Russian bookie and gambler, who works as a dentist when he is not gambling in Las Vegas.
Dylan McDermott as Captain David "Dave" Pratman, who became a pilot for Jackpot after being honorably discharged from the Air Force (thus ruining his dream of being a fighter pilot). He indulges in drugs, alcohol, and women to forget the pain of his failed marriages.

Recurring
Amir Talai as Alan, the co-pilot
Zachary Knighton as Bryan, a chef and Ronnie's boyfriend
Amy Landecker as Patricia Hayes, Nichole's mother and Captain Dave's love interest
Kether Donohue as Meghan, Colin's ex-wife.
Dermot Mulroney as Captain Steve Jasser, one of Pratman's rivals.
Alison Becker as Caroline, a flight attendant for Jackpot
Josh Duhamel as Captain Kyle
Don Johnson as Jack Silver, the CEO of Jackpot Airlines.

Episodes
{{Episode table |background=#000000 |overall= |title= |director= |writer=  |airdate= |prodcode= |viewers=  |country=U.S. |episodes=

{{Episode list
 |EpisodeNumber = 12
 |Title = Training Day
 |DirectedBy = Jim Hensz
 |WrittenBy = Lon Zimmet & Jess Pineda & Jeremy Roth
 |ProdCode = 1LAS12
 |OriginalAirDate = 
 |Viewers = 2.15<ref name="1.12">{{cite web|url=http://tvbythenumbers.zap2it.com/daily-ratings/tuesday-final-ratings-april-10-2018/|archive-url=https://web.archive.org/web/20180412082800/http://tvbythenumbers.zap2it.com/daily-ratings/tuesday-final-ratings-april-10-2018/|url-status=dead|archive-date=April 12, 2018|title=Roseanne,' 'The Middle,' 'Lethal Weapon' adjust up, 'Black-ish' down: Tuesday final ratings|website=TV by the Numbers|last=Porter|first=Rick|date=April 11, 2018|access-date=April 11, 2018}}</ref>
 |ShortSummary = Ronnie, Bernard, and Captain Dave attend Jackpot's yearly training seminar. Unlike the booze-fueled banger of years past, the seminar is straight-laced and orderly thanks to customer complaints about the LA to Vegas crew. Dave makes inroads with the younger pilots by telling embarrassing stories about Ronnie and Bernard's on-duty behavior. These stories spread around the seminar, and the two are suspended indefinitely. Thanks to drugged food from the Jackpot crew in Reno, chaos breaks out on the flight home that the younger crew and pilots cannot contain. With Dave helping from the cockpit, Ronnie and Bernard get the situation under control, and Jackpot shows its gratitude by lifting their suspensions. Meanwhile, Colin, Artem, and Nichole stake out a slot machine in the Vegas airport that's due to pay out a huge jackpot. After luring an old woman away from it and enduring a lengthy power outage, they repeatedly play the machine to no avail; soon after they give up, someone else wins the jackpot.
 |LineColor = 000
}}

}}

Reception
Critical response
On review aggregator Rotten Tomatoes, the series has an approval rating of 56% based on 16 reviews, with an average rating of 5.84/10. The website's critical consensus reads, "Refreshingly lewd humor and funny, relatable characters are crammed into LA to Vegas'' alongside pacing problems and a dearth of punchlines, leaving this sitcom's high-flying potential stuck in an amiable holding pattern." On Metacritic, the season has a weighted average score of 43 out of 100, based on 13 critics, indicating "mixed or average reviews".

Ratings

References

External links
 

2018 American television series debuts
2018 American television series endings
2010s American single-camera sitcoms
2010s American workplace comedy television series
Aviation television series
English-language television shows
Fox Broadcasting Company original programming
Television series by Steven Levitan Productions
Television series by Gary Sanchez Productions
Television series by 20th Century Fox Television
Television shows set in Las Vegas
Television shows set in Los Angeles
Television series about flight attendants